The  Pittsburgh Power season was the first season for the franchise in the Arena Football League. The team was coached by Chris Siegfried and played their home games at Consol Energy Center. In their inaugural season, the Power finished 9–9, missing the playoffs.

Standings

Regular season schedule
Pittsburgh's inaugural season began at home against the Philadelphia Soul on March 11. They traveled to Philadelphia on July 23 for their final regular season game.

Roster

Regular season

Week 1: vs. Philadelphia Soul

Week 2: vs. Iowa Barnstormers

Week 3: at Milwaukee Mustangs

Week 4: vs. Tulsa Talons

Week 5: BYE

Week 6: vs. Jacksonville Sharks

Week 7: at New Orleans VooDoo

Week 8: at Georgia Force

Week 9: vs. Spokane Shock

Week 10: vs. San Jose SaberCats

Week 11: BYE

Week 12: at Dallas Vigilantes

Week 13: vs. Cleveland Gladiators

Week 14: at Tampa Bay Storm

Week 15: at Utah Blaze

Week 16: vs. Milwaukee Mustangs

Week 17: at Orlando Predators

Week 18: vs. Arizona Rattlers

Week 19: at Cleveland Gladiators

Week 20: at Philadelphia Soul

References

Pittsburgh Power
Pittsburgh Power seasons